Bagossy Brothers Company is a Hungarian pop-rock band, founded in 2013.

History 
The band was founded in 11th May 2013 in Gyergyószentmiklós, Transylvania with the help of musicians who have been playing together for several years. The band's name was inspired by the family names of the Bagossy brothers (Norbert Bagossy and László Bagossy).

Members 
 Norbert Bagossy - vocals / guitar
 László Bagossy - bass / backing vocals
 Szilárd Bartis - drums
 Attila Tatár - guitars / backing vocals
 Zsombor Kozma - keyboards / accordion / violin

External links 
 

Hungarian musical groups
Hungarian electronic musicians
Musical groups established in 2013
Hungarian rock music groups
2013 establishments in Hungary